The 1942 Western Illinois Leathernecks football team represented Western Illinois University as a member of the Illinois Intercollegiate Athletic Conference (IIAC) during the 1942 college football season. They were led by first-year head coach Wix Garner and played their home games at Morgan Field. The Leathernecks finished the season with a 5–0–2 record overall and a 3–0–1 record in conference play, winning the IIAC title.

Schedule

References

Western Illinois
Western Illinois Leathernecks football seasons
Interstate Intercollegiate Athletic Conference football champion seasons
Western Illinois Leathernecks football
College football undefeated seasons